Art of Living or The Art of Living may refer to:

 Art of Living Foundation, a volunteer-based, humanitarian and educational non-governmental organization
The Art of Living International Center, Bangalore, India
Art of Living Center (Los Angeles), U.S.
 The Art of Living, a long-running radio program and later a book by Norman Vincent Peale
 The Art of Living (film), a 1965 Spanish drama film
 The Art of Living, a 1965 book by Dietrich von Hildebrand with Alice von Hildebrand
 The Art of Living: Peace and Freedom in the Here and Now, a 2017 book by Vietnamese Buddhist monk Thích Nhất Hạnh
 Art of Living, a 1993 album and song by The Boomers (band)
 The Art of Living, a 1967 painting by René Magritte

See also
 The Art of Living Long, a 1550 book of Luigi Cornaro
Stoicism